The Uvac Monastery is a Serbian Orthodox monastery in western Serbia.

Architecture
The monastery was built in the Raška architectural school.  In terms of architectural and spatial traits, there is resemblance between the Uvac Monastery, Morača Monastery, Church of the Annunciation Monastery in Ovčar Banja, Pustinja Monastery, Dobrilovina Monastery, Majstorovina Monastery, Tronoša Monastery and others.

See also

List of Serbian Orthodox monasteries

References

External links
http://www.uzice.net/uvac/uvace.htm

13th-century Serbian Orthodox church buildings
17th-century Serbian Orthodox church buildings
Serbian Orthodox monasteries in Serbia
1622 establishments in the Ottoman Empire
Užice
Medieval Serbian Orthodox monasteries
17th-century establishments in Serbia
Monasteries of the Eparchy of Žiča